Alexander Thomson (1817–1875) was a Scottish architect, also known as 'Greek' Thomson.

Alexander Thomson may also refer to:
 Alexander Thomson (pioneer) (1798–1866), Australian pioneer and first mayor of Geelong, Victoria
 Alexander Thomson (congressman) (1788–1848), US congressman from Pennsylvania
 Sir Alexander Thomson (Baron of the Exchequer) (died 1817), Baron and then Chief Baron of the Exchequer
 Alexander Thomson (minister) (c. 1593–1646), minister in the Church of Scotland
 Alexander MacDonald Thomson (1863–1924), colonial treasurer of Hong Kong from 1899 to 1918
 Alexander McDonald Thomson (1822–1898), speaker of the Wisconsin State Assembly
 Alexander Raven Thomson (1899–1955), British fascist politician
 Alexander Thomson, Lord Thomson (1914–1979), Scottish judge, senator of the College of Justice from 1965
 Alexander Thomson (footballer), Scottish international footballer
 Alexander Thomson of Banchory (1798-1868) Scottish antiquary and agriculturalist

See also
 Alex Thomson (disambiguation)
 Alexander Thompson (disambiguation)